Osina (old version: Usina) is a village in Southwestern Bulgaria. It is located in the Satovcha Municipality, Blagoevgrad Province.

Geography 

The village of Osina is located in the Western Rhodope Mountains. It belongs to the Chech region.

History 

The village was founded some time in the beginning of the 15th century when shepherds from the village of Kochan moved to the place where they had their dairies to avoid getting infected with plague. At a later time the village saw more refugees from the area around Serres but it is not known when and under what circumstances it happened.

In 1873 Osina (Oussina) had male population of 150 Pomaks and 50 houses. According to Vasil Kanchov, in 1900 Osina (Усина) was populated by 250 Bulgarian Muslims According to Stephan Verkovic at the end of the 19th century the village had male population of 173 Pomaks and 50 houses.

Religions 

The population is Muslim and consists of Pomaks.

Cultural and natural landmarks 

 Remains of a settlement from the Stone-Copper Age northwest from the village;
 Remains of a medieval settlement northeast from the village;
 Remains of a medieval settlement northwest from the village;
 Remains of a church west from the village;
 Remains of an old road near the village.

Further reading

Notes 

Villages in Blagoevgrad Province
Chech